The Uprising of Konstantin and Fruzhin (Vastanie na Konstantin i Fruzhin) was the earliest Bulgarian uprising against Ottoman rule. It was organized in the early 15th century by two Bulgarian nobles and was supported by a Christian coalition, but failed to liberate Bulgaria.

Fruzhin, the son of Tsar Ivan Shishman, and his cousin Konstantin, the heir of Ivan Sratsimir, who had emigrated to Hungary and Serbia as the Ottomans subjugated the Balkans, organized an uprising in northern Bulgaria aided by Wallachian ruler Mircea the Elder, Serbian despot Stefan Lazarević and Hungarian monarch Sigismund.

 
The Ottoman defeat by Timur in the Battle of Ankara of 1402 provided good conditions for an uprising, and the Christian forces crossed the Danube from the north into the Bulgarian lands: Mircea I, accompanied by Konstantin, invaded Dobruja, while Fruzhin together with the Serbian-supported Hungarian army entered the northwestern Bulgarian lands (around Vidin). These initially successful invasions were followed by an uprising of the Bulgarian population in some areas.

The scale, time and duration of the uprising is not certain. According to some sources, it broke out in 1404, but was quickly crushed by one of Bayezid I's sons, Süleyman, with Wallachia nevertheless retaining Dobruja and Stefan Lazarević extending his realm's territory, whereas Konstantin and Fruzhin's efforts were futile. Others claim that the uprising began in 1408, and Konstantin and Fruzhin managed to regain their domains from the late Bulgarian Empire south of the Danube at least until 1413, when Musa Çelebi, another son of Bayezid, is documented to have "ruined the Bulgarians". According to a third group of historians, who base their theory on the note of Doukas that Bulgarian delegates attended the Bursa negotiations between Mehmed I and Manuel II Palaiologos in 1413, the uprising was crushed as late as 1418 alongside several other unrelated rebellions.

After the end of the uprising, its leaders Konstantin and Fruzhin once again settled abroad, Konstantin in Serbia and Fruzhin in Hungary. Konstantin died in 1422 in Serbia, while Fruzhin continued to work actively in Hungary to restore the Bulgarian Empire. He took part in Dan II's attack on Silistra in 1425, then again in 1426 against Vidin that is briefly recovered and put under Fruzhin's rule. Fruzhin also was granted the domain of Lippa (Lipova) in Temes (Timiș) by Sigismund at about the same time. Fruzhin was sent by the Hungarian king to help the Albanian rebels under Gjergj Arianit Komneni in 1435. He also participated in Władysław III of Poland's campaign that culminated in the Battle of Varna in 1444, and died around 1460.

References

 

15th century in Bulgaria
15th-century rebellions
Bulgarian rebellions
Medieval rebellions in Europe
Rebellions against the Ottoman Empire
15th century in the Ottoman Empire
Tsardom of Vidin